Woodridge is one of the northern suburbs of Wellington, New Zealand, north of Newlands and Paparangi.

History  
Woodridge Estate began in the 1980s after Norman Wright bought the Newlands dairy farm from J.S. Meadowcroft (who also owned Broadmeadows), and began to divide portions into lots. The Wright family chose trees and wood as a theme, and most streets bear the names of trees. By 2011 about half the planned houses or 200 homes had been built. A land exchange with the WCC allowed for development of a walkway to Seton Nossiter Park.

Demographics 

Woodridge had a population of 1,605 at the 2018 New Zealand census, an increase of 339 people (26.8%) since the 2013 census, and an increase of 630 people (64.6%) since the 2006 census. There were 546 households. There were 795 males and 810 females, giving a sex ratio of 0.98 males per female. The median age was 35.2 years (compared with 37.4 years nationally), with 381 people (23.7%) aged under 15 years, 285 (17.8%) aged 15 to 29, 855 (53.3%) aged 30 to 64, and 84 (5.2%) aged 65 or older.

Ethnicities were 47.7% European/Pākehā, 5.8% Māori, 3.9% Pacific peoples, 47.3% Asian, and 4.9% other ethnicities (totals add to more than 100% since people could identify with multiple ethnicities).

The proportion of people born overseas was 45.6%, compared with 27.1% nationally.

Although some people objected to giving their religion, 38.3% had no religion, 34.0% were Christian, 15.9% were Hindu, 3.2% were Muslim, 2.4% were Buddhist and 2.2% had other religions.

Of those at least 15 years old, 540 (44.1%) people had a bachelor or higher degree, and 87 (7.1%) people had no formal qualifications. The median income was $52,200, compared with $31,800 nationally. The employment status of those at least 15 was that 795 (65.0%) people were employed full-time, 138 (11.3%) were part-time, and 45 (3.7%) were unemployed.

Parks and reserves

Hauora Reserve 
Hauora Reserve is perched around the top of the large hill overlooking Woodridge, with entrances on Red Beech Avenue, Astelia Way and Cedarwood Street. The name of the reserve roughly translates to healthy wind in Maori, in reference to the famous high wind speeds in the Wellington region. The reserve contains a large walking track circling the grassy hill, marked by several stone cairns. A children's playground is located near the Red Beech Avenue area of the pathway.

Kentwood Drive Reserve 
Kentwood Drive reserve is a large grassy area located on Kentwood Drive. A large children's playground is located here. A small stream flows down the east side of the reserve from a bush-clad gully.

Seton Nossiter Park 
While not located in Woodridge itself, Seton Nossiter Park can be accessed via Lindsays Track. The trailhead begins in the reserve area on White Pine Avenue. Several paths connect Woodridge to Newlands and Grenada Village.

Transport

Bus Services 
Woodridge is served by several bus services which link it to the wider Wellington area, operated by Newlands Coach Services on behalf of Metlink Wellington.

References

 
Suburbs of Wellington City